Mario Bautista (born July 1, 1993) is an American mixed martial artist. He currently competing in the Bantamweight division in the Ultimate Fighting Championship (UFC).

Background 
Bautista was born in Winnemucca, Nevada, United States. He  started wrestling at the age of 14 and competed throughout his high school years prior started training in jiu-jitsu. Bautista moved from Nevada to Arizona and joined MMA Lab and trained under John Crouch where he started his professional MMA career in 2012.

Mixed martial arts career

Early career 
Bautista fought in various promotions such as Tachi Palace Fights, and Combate Americas, in regional Arizona and California circuit and amassed a record of 6-0 prior signed by UFC.

Ultimate Fighting Championship 
In his UFC debut, Bautista faced Cory Sandhagen, replacing injured  John Lineker, on January 19, 2019 at UFC Fight Night: Cejudo vs. Dillashaw. He lost the bout via first round submission.

Bautista faced Jin Soo Son on July 20, 2019 at UFC on ESPN: dos Anjos vs. Edwards. He won the fight via unanimous decision.

On February 8, 2020, Bautista faced Miles Johns at UFC 247. He won the fight via technical knockout in round two. This win earned him the Performance of the Night award.

Bautista faced Trevin Jones, replacing Randy Costa, on March 6, 2021 at UFC 259. He lost the fight via technical knockout in round two.

Bautista was scheduled to face Guido Cannetti on August 28, 2021 at UFC on ESPN 30. However, Bautista tested positive for COVID-19 and was pulled from the card.

Bautista was scheduled to face Khalid Taha on February 19, 2022 at UFC Fight Night 201. However, Taha had to pull out off the bout due to undisclosed reasons and was replaced by newcomer Jay Perrin. Bautista won the fight via unanimous decision.

Bautista faced Brian Kelleher on June 25, 2022, at UFC on ESPN 38. He won the fight via a rear-naked choke submission in the first round.

Bautista faced Benito Lopez on November 5, 2022 at UFC Fight Night 214. At the weigh-ins, Lopez weighed in at 138.5 pounds, two and a half pounds over the bantamweight non-title fight limit. Lopez will be fined 20% of this individual purse which will go to Bautista. He won the fight via a reverse triangle armbar submission in the first round. This win earned him the Performance of the Night award.

The match between Bautista and Guido Cannetti was rescheduled for UFC Fight Night 221 on March 11, 2023. He won the fight via a rear-naked choke submission in the first round.

Championships and accomplishments

Mixed martial arts
Ultimate Fighting Championship
Performance of the Night (Two times)

Mixed martial arts record 

|-
|Win
|align=center|12–2
|Guido Cannetti
|Submission (rear-naked choke)
|UFC Fight Night: Yan vs. Dvalishvili
|
|align=center|1
|align=center|3:18
|Las Vegas, Nevada, United States
|
|-
|Win
|align=center|11–2
|Benito Lopez
|Submission (reverse triangle armbar)
|UFC Fight Night: Rodriguez vs. Lemos
|
|align=center|1
|align=center|4:54
|Las Vegas, Nevada, United States
|
|-
|Win
|align=center|10–2
|Brian Kelleher
|Submission (rear-naked choke)
|UFC on ESPN: Tsarukyan vs. Gamrot
|
|align=center|1
|align=center|2:27
|Las Vegas, Nevada, United States
|
|-
|Win
|align=center|9–2
|Jay Perrin
|Decision (unanimous)
|UFC Fight Night: Walker vs. Hill
|
|align=center|3
|align=center|5:00
|Las Vegas, Nevada, United States
|
|-
|Loss
|align=center|8–2
|Trevin Jones
|TKO (punches)
|UFC 259
|
|align=center|2
|align=center|0:40
|Las Vegas, Nevada, United States
|
|-
|Win
|align=center|8–1
|Miles Johns
|TKO (flying knee and punches)
|UFC 247
|
|align=center|2
|align=center|1:41
|Houston, Texas, United States
|
|-
|Win
|align=center|7–1
|Son Jin-soo
|Decision (unanimous)
|UFC on ESPN: dos Anjos vs. Edwards
|
|align=center|3
|align=center|5:00
|San Antonio, Texas, United States
||
|-
|Loss
|align=center|6–1
|Cory Sandhagen
|Submission (armbar)
|UFC Fight Night: Cejudo vs. Dillashaw
|
|align=center|1
|align=center|3:31
|Brooklyn, New York, United States
|
|-
|Win
|align=center|6–0
|Juan Pablo Gonzalez
|Decision (unanimous)
|Combate Americas: Mexico vs. USA
|
|align=center|3
|align=center|5:00
|Tucson, Arizona, United States
|
|-
|Win
|align=center|5–0
|A.J. Robb
|Submission (guillotine choke)
|LFA 44
|
|align=center|2
|align=center|3:30
|Phoenix, Arizona, United States
|
|-
|Win
|align=center|4–0
|Raphael Montini de Lima
|TKO (doctor stoppage)
|LFA 31
|
|align=center|2
|align=center|5:00
|Phoenix, Arizona, United States
|
|-
|Win
|align=center|3–0
|DeMarcus Brown
|Submission (rear-naked choke)
|Smash Global 6
|
|align=center|1
|align=center|4:46
|Los Angeles, United States
|
|-
|Win
|align=center|2–0
|Devon Chavez
|Submission (D'Arce choke)
|Tachi Palace Fights 32
|
|align=center|2
|align=center|0:59
|Lemoore, California, United States
|
|-
|Win
|align=center|1–0
|Jesse Orta
|TKO (punches)
|Iron Boy MMA 6
|
|align=center|1
|align=center|1:28
|Phoenix, Arizona, United States
|
|-

See also 
 List of current UFC fighters
 List of male mixed martial artists

References

External links 

 
 

1993 births
Living people
American male mixed martial artists
Sportspeople from Nevada
Mixed martial artists from Arizona
Sportspeople from Phoenix, Arizona
Bantamweight mixed martial artists
Mixed martial artists utilizing wrestling
Ultimate Fighting Championship male fighters